Legião Urbana is the self-titled debut album by Brazilian rock band Legião Urbana. It was released on 1 January 1985.

"Será" was selected as the album's first single and it received a video, shot on May 25, 26 and 27, 1985 at the nightclub Rose Bom Bom, in São Paulo, directed by Toniko Melo. All tracks were already ready before the album's sessions, except for "Por Enquanto".

Legião Urbana sold a total of 550,000 copies and, in 2007, the Brazilian edition of Rolling Stone magazine elected Legião Urbana as 40th in the 100 Greatest Brazilian Music Records.

The artwork on the album cover was designed by drummer Marcelo Bonfá.

Background 
In the early 1980s, then future leader of Legião Urbana Renato Russo was a friend of the already-established band Os Paralamas do Sucesso. Their debut album, Cinema Mudo, was in production stages and would include "Química", a song written by Russo. Jorge Davidson, then artistic manager of EMI Odeon, the label via which the album would be released, listened to the track and wanted to know more about Russo and Legião Urbana.

After being promoted to artistic director of the national department, Davidson invited Legião Urbana to join the label, being the first band brought by him:

Production and recording

Pre-production and Renato Rocha's arrival 
The band went to Rio de Janeiro and was initially going to record only one single with two songs, but they struggled to find a producer. Marcelo Sussekind (Herva Doce) was the first to be invited (by Davidson), but he refused. They then approached Rick Ferreira, Raul Seixas' session guitarist, but artistic differences between him and the band soon brought an end to their relationship.

When they were close to giving up, they received some incentive from Mayrton Bahia, then repertoire manager of EMI-Odeon. He explained them how the music industry worked and how they should behave in the face of a difficulty.

Two months later, the band returned to Rio with good news: they would meet Seixas in person, since he was staying at the same hotel they were; they would record a full-length album instead of a single; and they had secured themselves a producer: José Emilio Rondeau. Rondeau himself requested EMI to be the album's producer, after learning the band had signed with the company. Their relationship with Rondeau also eroded quickly, however, specially on Bonfá's behalf. The producer once even got in his car, ready to take off and abandon the album, but Russo and Bonfá begged him to stay.

In the meantime, the band hired a fourth member: bassist Renato Rocha, who became a member after Russo (also the bassist until then) lost part of his hands movements by trying to slit his own wrists. He would be quite kept to himself initially, doing nothing beyond following Russo's inputs. He did contribute, however, to "A Dança"'s arrangement.

Recording 
The band wanted to produce a "simple work, without too many musical adornments and lots of authenticity". Russo recorded his voice with two valve microphones; one in front of his mouth and the other above it, in order to capture reverberation. Bonfá's drums were recorded by microphones strategically positioned all over walls and windows of the studio. Rondeau worked to fulfill the band's will to create a sound that was neither too raw, nor too artificial.

By editing "Perdidos no Espaço" with a razor blade and duct tape, he started the trend of editing recording tapes with handicraft-like methods, in a pre-digital era.

The final result did not please Russo completely. He wanted the effort to sound as if recorded live, with all members playing together. However, only "Petróleo do Futuro" reached such standard.

"Geração Coca-Cola" was considered the most important song by the label's executives. However, Davidson only showed them the lyrics, fearing the "heavy" and "contesting" instrumentation could risk the contract. Actually, EMI-Odeon hoped for some folk; because of that, Davidson suggested the band to be inspired by Bob Seger and recorded the track on acoustic guitars. Many forms were attempted, including humorous versions and versions played as if for a party, but the one that made it to the album was "less raw, but completely loyal" to what the band wanted.

Sound 
Two years after Legião Urbana's, Russo said:

Reception and legacy 
Writing for Allmusic, Alvaro Neder gave the album 2.5 stars and said that "like many young bands, early on they clearly lacked the confidence to assert their opinions over those of their record company" while calling "Ainda é Cedo" "unquestionably the band's first unmitigated triumph".

In 2014, an instrumental version of "Por Enquanto" was used for a Brahma TV ad for the 2014 FIFA World Cup.

In 2016, the album was re-released as Legião Urbana 30 Anos in a double-album format by Universal Music. One of the discs is the original album and the other is a compilation of re-releases.

Track listing

Legião Urbana 30 Anos (CD 2)

Personnel
Legião Urbana
 Renato Russo — vocals, rhythm guitar, acoustic guitar, keyboards
 Dado Villa-Lobos — lead guitar, acoustic guitar, sound effects
 Renato Rocha — bass guitar
 Marcelo Bonfá — drums, percussion, glockenspiel

Technical personnel
 Ricardo Leite - cover

Sales and certifications

References

 

1985 debut albums
Legião Urbana albums